Sharon Maria Jacoba Gerarda Gesthuizen (born 23 January 1976 in Nijmegen) is a Dutch politician and former businesswoman and trade unionist. As a member of the Socialist Party (Socialistische Partij) she was an MP between 30 November 2006 and 23 March 2017. She focused on matters of economic affairs, asylum and immigration policy, and judiciary.

From April till December 2006 she was a member of the municipal council of Haarlem.

In 2018 she left the Socialist Party in favor of GreenLeft because she didn't agree with the party's stance on migration.

Gesthuizen grew up in Millingen aan de Rijn and studied art at the Artez Institute of the Arts in Arnhem. From 2002 to 2003 she was a member of the Dutch Student Union (LSVb).

References

External links 

  House of Representatives biography

1976 births
Living people
21st-century Dutch businesspeople
21st-century Dutch politicians
21st-century Dutch women politicians
Dutch trade unionists
Members of the House of Representatives (Netherlands)
Municipal councillors of Haarlem
People from Millingen aan de Rijn
People from Nijmegen
Socialist Party (Netherlands) politicians